William James Dixon (July 1, 1915January 29, 1992) was an American blues musician, vocalist, songwriter, arranger and record producer. He was proficient in playing both the upright bass and the guitar, and sang with a distinctive voice, but he is perhaps best known as one of the most prolific songwriters of his time. Next to Muddy Waters, Dixon is recognized as the most influential person in shaping the post–World War II sound of the Chicago blues.

Dixon's songs have been recorded by countless musicians in many genres as well as by various ensembles in which he participated. A short list of his most famous compositions includes "Hoochie Coochie Man", "I Just Want to Make Love to You", "Little Red Rooster", "My Babe", "Spoonful", and "You Can't Judge a Book by the Cover". These songs were written during the peak years of Chess Records, from 1950 to 1965, and were performed by Muddy Waters, Howlin' Wolf, Little Walter, and Bo Diddley; they influenced a generation of musicians worldwide.

Dixon was an important link between the blues and rock and roll, working with Chuck Berry and Bo Diddley in the late 1950s. In the 1960s, his songs were adapted by numerous rock artists. He received a Grammy Award and was inducted into the Blues Hall of Fame, the Rock and Roll Hall of Fame, and the Songwriters Hall of Fame.

Biography

Early life
Dixon was born in Vicksburg, Mississippi, on July 1, 1915.  He was one of fourteen children. His mother, Daisy, often rhymed things she said, a habit her son imitated. At the age of seven, young Dixon became an admirer of a band that featured pianist Little Brother Montgomery. He sang his first song at Springfield Baptist Church at the age of four. Dixon was first introduced to blues when he served time on prison farms in Mississippi as a young teenager. Later in his teens, he learned to sing harmony from a local carpenter, Theo Phelps, who led a gospel quintet, the Union Jubilee Singers, in which Dixon sang bass; the group regularly performed on the Vicksburg radio station WQBC. He began adapting his poems into songs and even sold some to local music groups.

Adulthood
Dixon left Mississippi for Chicago in 1936. A man of considerable stature, standing 6 feet 6 inches tall and weighing over 250 pounds, he took up boxing, at which he was successful, winning the Illinois State Golden Gloves Heavyweight Championship (Novice Division) in 1937. He became a professional boxer and worked briefly as Joe Louis's sparring partner, but after four fights he left boxing in a dispute with his manager over money.

Dixon met Leonard Caston at a boxing gym, where they would harmonize at times. Dixon performed in several vocal groups in Chicago, but it was Caston that persuaded him to pursue music seriously. Caston built him his first bass, made of a tin can and one string. Dixon's experience singing bass made the instrument familiar. He also learned to play the guitar.

In 1939, Dixon was a founding member of the Five Breezes, with Caston, Joe Bell, Gene Gilmore and Willie Hawthorne. The group blended blues, jazz, and vocal harmonies, in the mode of the Ink Spots. Dixon's progress on the upright bass came to an abrupt halt with the advent of World War II, when he refused induction into military service as a conscientious objector and was imprisoned for ten months. He refused to go to war because he would not fight for a nation in which institutionalized racism and racist laws were prevalent. After the war, he formed a group named the Four Jumps of Jive. He then reunited with Caston, forming the Big Three Trio, which went on to record for Columbia Records.

Pinnacle of career

Dixon signed with Chess Records as a recording artist, but he began performing less, being more involved with administrative tasks for the label. By 1951, he was a full-time employee at Chess, where he acted as producer, talent scout, session musician and staff songwriter. He was also a producer for the Chess subsidiary Checker Records. His relationship with Chess was sometimes strained, but he stayed with the label from 1948 to the early 1960s. During this time Dixon's output and influence were prodigious. From late 1956 to early 1959, he worked in a similar capacity for Cobra Records, for which he produced early singles for Otis Rush, Magic Sam, and Buddy Guy. In 1956, Dixon wrote "Fishin' in My Pond", which was recorded by Lee Jackson, and released on Cobra in February 1957. Dixon later recorded for Bluesville Records. From the late 1960s until the mid-1970s, Dixon ran his own record label, Yambo Records, and two subsidiary labels, Supreme and Spoonful. He released his 1971 album, Peace?, on Yambo and also singles by McKinley Mitchell, Lucky Peterson and others.

Dixon is considered one of the key figures in the creation of Chicago blues. He worked with Chuck Berry, Muddy Waters, Howlin' Wolf, Otis Rush, Bo Diddley, Joe Louis Walker, Little Walter, Sonny Boy Williamson, Koko Taylor, Little Milton, Eddie Boyd, Jimmy Witherspoon, Lowell Fulson, Willie Mabon, Memphis Slim, Washboard Sam, Jimmy Rogers, Sam Lay and others.

In December 1964, the Rolling Stones reached number one on the UK Singles Chart with their cover of Dixon's "Little Red Rooster". In the same year, the group also covered "I Just Want To Make Love To You" on their debut album, The Rolling Stones.

Copyright battles
In his later years, Dixon became a tireless ambassador for the blues and a vocal advocate for its practitioners, founding the Blues Heaven Foundation, which works to preserve the legacy of the blues and to secure copyrights and royalties for blues musicians who were exploited in the past. Speaking with the simple eloquence that was a hallmark of his songs, Dixon claimed, "The blues are the roots and the other musics are the fruits. It's better keeping the roots alive, because it means better fruits from now on. The blues are the roots of all American music. As long as American music survives, so will the blues."
In 1977, unhappy with the small royalties paid by Chess's publishing company, Arc Music, Dixon and Muddy Waters sued Arc and, with the proceeds from the settlement, founded their own publishing company, Hoochie Coochie Music.

In 1987, Dixon reached an out-of-court settlement with the rock band Led Zeppelin after suing for plagiarism in the band's use of his music in "Bring It On Home" and lyrics from his composition "You Need Love" (1962) in the band's recording of "Whole Lotta Love".

Death and legacy
Dixon's health increasingly deteriorated during the 1970s and the 1980s, primarily as a result of long-term diabetes. Eventually one of his legs was amputated.

Dixon was inducted into the Blues Hall of Fame in 1980, in the inaugural session of the Blues Foundation's ceremony. In 1989 he received a Grammy Award for his album Hidden Charms.

Dixon died of heart failure on January 29, 1992, in Burbank, California, and was buried in Burr Oak Cemetery, in Alsip, Illinois. After his death, his widow, Marie Dixon, took over the Blues Heaven Foundation and moved the headquarters to Chess Records. Dixon was posthumously inducted into the Rock and Roll Hall of Fame in the category Early Influences (pre-rock) in 1994. On April 28, 2013, both Dixon and his grandson Alex Dixon were inducted into the Chicago Blues Hall of Fame.

In 2007, Dixon was honored with a marker on the Mississippi Blues Trail in Vicksburg.

The actor and comedian Cedric the Entertainer portrayed Dixon in Cadillac Records, a 2008 film based on the early history of Chess Records.

Songs

Dixon wrote or co-wrote over 500 songs. Several have become blues standards, including "Help Me", "Hoochie Coochie Man", "I Can't Quit You Baby", "I'm Ready", "Little Red Rooster", "My Babe", and "Spoonful". Other Dixon compositions that reached the record charts include "Evil" (Howlin' Wolf), "I Just Want to Make Love to You" (Muddy Waters), "Pretty Thing" (Bo Diddley), "The Seventh Son" (Willie Mabon), "Wang Dang Doodle" (Koko Taylor), and "You Can't Judge a Book by the Cover" (Bo Diddley). In the 1960s, his songs were adapted by numerous rock artists.

Discography

Albums

Notes

References

Sources

 Dixon, Willie (1992). Willie Dixon: Master Blues Composer, with Notes and Tablature. Hal Leonard. .

External links

 
 
 
 Willie Dixon, Mississippi blues musician. Mississippi Writers and Musicians Project of Starkville High School
 Willie Dixon's Blues Heaven Foundation
 Willie Dixon's Official Website

1915 births
1992 deaths
African-American guitarists
American amputees
American blues guitarists
American male guitarists
American blues singer-songwriters
American conscientious objectors
American double-bassists
Male double-bassists
American music arrangers
Record producers from Illinois
American session musicians
Blues musicians from Mississippi
Checker Records artists
Cobra Records artists
Chicago blues musicians
Grammy Award winners
Jive singers
Jump blues musicians
Musicians from Vicksburg, Mississippi
Singer-songwriters from Mississippi
20th-century American businesspeople
20th-century American guitarists
Singer-songwriters from Illinois
Slap bassists (double bass)
Guitarists from Illinois
Guitarists from Mississippi
Burials at Burr Oak Cemetery
20th-century double-bassists
20th-century American male musicians
American male jazz musicians
Mississippi Blues Trail
African-American male singer-songwriters
20th-century African-American male singers
Record producers from Mississippi